Tricholoma rhizophoreti is an agaric fungus of the genus Tricholoma. It is found in Singapore, where it fruits on mud, sticks, roots, and stumps among mangrove trees. It was described as new to science in 1994 by English mycologist E.J.H. Corner.

See also
List of Tricholoma species

References

rhizophoreti
Fungi described in 1994
Fungi of Asia
Taxa named by E. J. H. Corner